Nationality words link to articles with information on the nation's poetry or literature (for instance, Irish or France).

Events

Works published in English

United Kingdom
 William Allingham, The Fairies, including "Up the airy mountain ..."; reprinted from Poems 1850
 Wilfrid Scawen Blunt, The Wind and the Whirlwind
 Robert Bridges, Prometheus the Firegiver
 Robert Browning, Jocoseria
 George Meredith, Poems and Lyrics of the Joy of Earth
 Algernon Charles Swinburne, A Century of Roundels

United States

 Francis James Child, editor, English and Scottish Popular Ballads, an anthology published in five volumes from this year to 1898
 Mary E. Wilkins Freeman, Decorative Plaques
 Emma Lazarus, "The New Colossus", written in aid of the Bartholdi Pedestal Fund for erection of the Statue of Liberty in New York Harbor
 Henry Wadsworth Longfellow, Michael Angelo, posthumously published
 James Whitcomb Riley, The Old Swimmin'-Hole and 'Leven More Poems
 John Greenleaf Whittier, The Bay of Seven Islands
 Jones Very, Poems, published posthumously
 Ella Wheeler Wilcox, Poems of Passion

Works published in other languages
 Gabriele D'Annunzio, L'intermezzo di rime, Italy
 Mihail Eminescu, Luceafărul, Romania
 Victor Hugo, La Légende des siècles, third series (first series 1859, second series 1877), France
 Jan Neruda, Prosté motivy, Czechia
 Aleksey Konstantinovich Tolstoy, History of the Russian State from Gostomysl to Timashev, Russian parody published posthumously
 Paul Verlaine, in November publishes an influential essay on Stéphane Mallarmé, which is later reprinted in the book Les Poetès maudits; France
 Albert Verwey, Persephone, Netherlands

Awards and honors

Births
Death years link to the corresponding "[year] in poetry" article:
 January 1 – Charles Badger Clark (died 1957), American
 January 6 – Khalil Gibran (died 1931), Lebanese American poet and artist
 January 21 – Olav Aukrust (died 1929), Norwegian poet and teacher
 February 7 – K. V. Simon, (died 1944), Indian Malayalam-language poet
 February 18
 Nikos Kazantzakis (died 1957), Greek author
 Jessie Litchfield, (died 1956), Australian author
 March 13 – Kōtarō Takamura 高村 光太郎 (died 1956), Japanese poet and sculptor; son of sculptor Kōun Takamura
 March 9 – Umberto Saba né Poli (died 1957), Italian poet and fiction writer
 March 16 – Ethel Anderson née Campbell (died 1958), English-born Australian
 March 27 (March 15 O.S.) – Marie Under (died 1980), Estonian
 May 7 – Anna Wickham, née Edith Alice Mary Harper, aka Edith Hepburn and John Oland (committed suicide 1947), English poet brought up in Australia
 June 27 – Geoffrey Studdert Kennedy (died 1929), English Anglican priest and poet
 August 11 – Ernst Stadler (killed 1914 in World War I), German Expressionist poet
 September 16 – T. E. Hulme (killed 1917 in World War I), influential English poetry critic
 September 17 – William Carlos Williams (died 1963), American
 November 10 – Arthur Davison Ficke (died 1945), American
 December 10 – Alfred Kreymborg (died 1966), American poet, novelist, playwright, literary editor and anthologist
 December 12 – William Baylebridge (died 1942)), Australian poet and short-story writer
 September 14 – Marjorie Pickthall (died 1922), English-born Canadian

Deaths
Death years link to the corresponding "[year] in poetry" article:
 January 5 – Charles Tompson (born 1806), Australian public servant said to be the first published Australian-born poet
 June 14
 Charles Timothy Brooks, 96, American poet and translator
 Edward Fitzgerald, 74, English poet and translator, best known for his translation of the Rubáiyát of Omar Khayyám
 George Moses Horton (born c. 1797), African-American

See also

 19th century in poetry
 19th century in literature
 List of years in poetry
 List of years in literature
 Victorian literature
 French literature of the 19th century
 Poetry

Notes

19th-century poetry
Poetry